Salarabad (also Romanized as Sālārābād; also known as Qārājālār) is a village in Qareh Poshtelu-e Pain Rural District, Qareh Poshtelu District, Zanjan County, Zanjan Province, Iran. At the 2006 census, its population was 23, in 4 families.

References 

Populated places in Zanjan County